Cain is a Biblical figure in the Book of Genesis within Abrahamic religions. He is the elder brother of Abel, and the firstborn son of Adam and Eve, the first couple within the Bible. He was a farmer who gave an offering of his crops to God. However, God was not pleased and favored Abel's offering over Cain's. Out of jealousy, Cain killed his brother, for which he was punished by God with the curse and mark of Cain. He had several children, starting with Enoch and including Lamech.

The narrative is notably unclear on God's reason for rejecting Cain's sacrifice. Some traditional interpretations consider Cain to be the originator of evil, violence, or greed. According to Genesis, Cain was the first human born and the first murderer.

Genesis narrative

Interpretations

Jewish and Christian interpretations 

A question arising early in the story is why God rejected Cain's sacrifice. The text states that "In the course of time Cain brought some of the fruits of the soil as an offering to the Lord. And Abel also brought an offering—fat portions from some of the firstborn of his flock. The Lord looked with favor on Abel and his offering, but on Cain and his offering he did not look with favor." Genesis 4:3-5a. Noteworthy is the difference in the type of sacrifice: fruits of the soil are renewable and bloodless. Fat-portions are set apart for the Lord [see Leviticus 3:16], and came from the firstborn - which point to an act of faith, since it is not guaranteed there will be more. The Midrash suggest that although Abel brought the best meat from his flock, Cain did not set aside for God the best of his harvest.

Similar to the internalized spiritual death God warns Adam and Eve of from eating the forbidden fruit - they do not physically die immediately but over the course of time their bodies age and die - the Lord warns Cain that his inappropriate anger is waiting to consume him: "If you do what is right, will you not be accepted? But if you do not do what is right, sin is crouching at your door; it desires to have you, but you must rule over it.” [ Genesis 4:7 ]

Curse and Mark

With the earth left cursed to drink Abel's blood, Cain was no longer able to farm the land. He becomes a "fugitive and wanderer", and receives a mark from God - commonly referred to as the mark of Cain - so that no one can enact vengeance on him.

Exegesis of the Septuagint's narrative, "groaning and shaking upon the earth" has Cain suffering from body tremors. Interpretations extend Cain's curse to his descendants, where they all died in the Great Deluge as retribution for the loss of Abel's potential offspring.

Islamic interpretation

Etymology 

One popular theory regarding the name of Cain connects it to the verb "kana" ( qnh), meaning "to get" and used by Eve in  when she says after bearing Cain, "I have gotten a man from the Lord." In this viewpoint, articulated by Nachmanides in the thirteenth century, Cain's name presages his role of mastery, power, and sin. In one of the Legends of the Jews, Cain is the fruit of a union between Eve and Satan, who is also the angel Samael and the serpent in the Garden of Eden, and Eve exclaims at Cain's birth, "I have gotten a man through an angel of the Lord."
According to the Life of Adam and Eve (c. 1st century CE), Cain fetched his mother a reed (qaneh) which is how he received his name Qayin (Cain). The symbolism of him fetching a reed may be a nod to his occupation as a farmer, as well as a commentary to his destructive nature. He is also described as "lustrous", which may reflect the Gnostic association of Cain with the sun.

Characteristics 

Cain is described as a city-builder, and the forefather of tent-dwelling pastoralists, all lyre and pipe players, and bronze and iron smiths.

In an alternate translation of Genesis 4:17, endorsed by a minority of modern commentators, Cain's son Enoch builds a city and names it after his son, Irad. Such a city could correspond with Eridu, one of the most ancient cities known. Philo observes that it makes no sense for Cain, the third human on Earth, to have founded an actual city. Instead, he argues, the city symbolizes an unrighteous philosophy.

The Targumim, rabbinic sources, and later speculations supplemented background details for the daughters of Adam and Eve. Such exegesis of Genesis 4 introduced Cain's wife as being his sister, a concept that has been accepted for at least 1,800 years. This can be seen with Jubilees 4 which narrates that Cain settled down and married his sister Awan, who bore their first son, the first Enoch, approximately 196 years after the creation of Adam. Cain then establishes the first city, naming it after his son, builds a house, and lives there until it collapses on him, killing him on the same year of Adam's death.

Relationship with the ground 
In this alternative reading of the text, the ground could be personified as a character. This reading is evidenced by given human qualities, like a mouth, in the scripture. The ground is also the only subject of an active verb in the verse that states, "It opens its mouth to take the blood." This suggests that the ground reacted to the situation. By that logic, the ground could then potentially be an accomplice to the murder of Abel (Jordstad 708). The reaction from the ground raises the question, "Does the intimate connection between humans and the ground mean that the ground mirrors or aids human action, regardless of the nature of that action?"

Other stories 

In Jewish tradition, Philo, Pirke De-Rabbi Eliezer and the Targum Pseudo-Jonathan asserted that Adam was not the father of Cain. Rather, Eve was subject to adultery having been seduced by either Sammael, the serpent (nahash) in the Garden of Eden, or the devil himself. Christian exegesis of the "evil one" in  have also led some commentators, like Tertullian, to agree that Cain was the son of the devil or some fallen angel. Thus, according to some interpreters, Cain was half-human and half-angelic, one of the Nephilim (Genesis 6). Gnostic exegesis in the Apocryphon of John has Eve seduced by Yaldabaoth. However, in the Hypostasis of the Archons, Eve is raped by a pair of Archons.

Pseudo-Philo, a Jewish work of the first century CE, narrates that Cain murdered his brother at the age of 15. After escaping to the Land of Nod, Cain fathered four sons: Enoch, Olad, Lizpha and Fosal; and two daughters: Citha and Maac (the latter five aren't mentioned in the Bible). Cain died at the age of 730, leaving his corrupt descendants spreading evil on earth. According to the Book of Jubilees, Cain murdered his brother with a stone. Afterwards, Cain was killed by the same instrument he used against his brother; his house fell on him and he was killed by its stones. A heavenly law was cited after the narrative of Cain's death saying:

With the instrument with which a man kills his neighbour with the same shall he be killed; after the manner that he wounded him, in like manner shall they deal with him.

A Talmudic tradition says that after Cain had murdered his brother, God made a horn grow on his head. Later, Cain was killed at the hands of his great grandson Lamech, who mistook him for a wild beast. A Christian version of this tradition from the time of the Crusades holds that the slaying of Cain by Lamech took place on a mound called "Cain Mons" (i.e. Mount Cain), which is a corruption of "Caymont", a Crusader fort in Tel Yokneam in modern-day Israel.

The story of Cain and Abel is also made reference to in chapter 19 of 1 Meqabyan, a book considered canonical in the Ethiopian Orthodox Tewahedo Church. In this text, Cain killed Abel because he desired Abel's wife.

According to the Mandaean scriptures including the Qolastā, the Book of John and Genzā Rabbā, Abel is cognate with the angelic soteriological figure Hibil Ziwa who taught John the Baptist.

In the book Aradia, or the Gospel of the Witches by Charles Godfrey Leland, Cain is a lunar figure.

Family

Family tree 

The following family tree of the line of Cain is compiled from a variety of biblical and extra-biblical texts.

Sisters/wives 

Various early commentators have said that Cain and Abel have sisters, usually twin sisters. According to Rabbi Joshua ben Karha as quoted in Genesis Rabbah, "Only two entered the bed, and seven left it: Cain and his twin sister, Abel and his two twin sisters."

Motives 

The Book of Genesis does not give a specific reason for the murder of Abel. Modern commentators typically assume that the motives were jealousy and anger due to God rejecting Cain's offering, while accepting Abel's. The First Epistle of John says the following:

Ancient exegetes, such as the Midrash and the Conflict of Adam and Eve with Satan, tell that the motive involved a desire for the most beautiful woman. According to Midrashic tradition, Cain and Abel each had twin sisters; each was to marry the other's. The Midrash states that Abel's promised wife, Aclima, was more beautiful than Awan, Cain's promised wife. And so, after Cain would not consent to this arrangement, Adam suggested seeking God's blessing by means of a sacrifice. Whoever God blessed would marry Aclima. When God openly rejected Cain's sacrifice, Cain slew his brother in a fit of jealousy and anger. Rabbinical exegetes have discussed whether Cain's incestuous relationship with his sister was in violation of halakha.

Legacy and symbolism 
A millennia-old explanation for Cain being capable of murder is that he may have been the offspring of a fallen angel or Satan himself, rather than being the son of Adam.

A medieval legend has Cain arriving at the Moon, where he eternally settled with a bundle of twigs. This was originated by the popular fantasy of interpreting the shadows on the Moon as a face. An example of this belief can be found in Dante Alighieri's Inferno (XX, 126) where the expression "Cain and the twigs" is used as a kenning for "moon".

In Latter-day Saint theology, Cain is considered to be the quintessential Son of Perdition, the father of secret combinations (i.e. secret societies and organized crime), as well as the first to hold the title Master Mahan meaning master of [the] great secret, that [he] may murder and get gain.

In Mormon folklore a second-hand account relates that an early Mormon leader, David W. Patten, encountered a very tall, hairy, dark-skinned man in Tennessee who said that he was Cain. The account states that Cain had earnestly sought death but was denied it, and that his mission was to destroy the souls of men. The recollection of Patten's story is quoted in Spencer W. Kimball's The Miracle of Forgiveness, a popular book within the Church of Jesus Christ of Latter-day Saints. This widespread Mormon belief is further emphasized by an account from Salt Lake City in 1963 which stated that "One superstition is based on the old Mormon belief that Cain is a black man who wanders the earth begging people to kill him and take his curse upon themselves (M, 24, SLC, 1963)."

Freud's theory of fratricide is explained by the Oedipus or Electra complex through Carl Jung's supplementation.

There were other, minor traditions concerning Cain and Abel, of both older and newer date. The apocryphal Life of Adam and Eve tells of Eve having a dream in which Cain drank his brother's blood. In an attempt to prevent the prophecy from happening the two young men are separated and given different jobs.

The author Daniel Quinn, first in his book Ishmael and later in The Story of B, proposes that the story of Cain and Abel is an account of early Semitic herdsmen observing the beginnings of what he calls totalitarian agriculture, with Cain representing the first 'modern' agriculturists and Abel the pastoralists.

Cultural portrayals and references 

 In the Old English classic poem Beowulf (c. 1000 CE), the monstrous Grendel and his mother are said to be descended from Cain.
The expression "Cain-coloured beard" (Cain and Judas were traditionally considered to have red or yellow hair) is used in Shakespeare's The Merry Wives of Windsor (1602).
 Lord Byron rewrote and dramatized the story in the play Cain (1821), viewing Cain as symbolic of a sanguine temperament, provoked by Abel's hypocrisy and sanctimony.
 Victor Hugo's poem "La Conscience" (1853, part of the La Légende des siècles collection) tells of Cain and his family fleeing from God's wrath.
 John Steinbeck's 1952 novel East of Eden (also a 1955 film) refers in its title to Cain's exile and contains discussions of the Cain and Abel story which then play out in the plot.
The role-playing game Vampire: the Masquerade (1991) refers to vampires as "Cainites" after Cain, who is referred to as the first vampire.
Country music group 4 Runner's song "Cain's Blood" (1995) uses Cain and Abel as a metaphor for the struggle between good and evil in the song's narrator.
 A "Mark of Cain" is featured in the TV series Supernatural (2005), and Cain appears as a character.
 Cain appears as the ultimate antagonist of the comic book series The Strange Talent of Luther Strode (2011).
 In Darren Aronofsky's allegorical film Mother! (2017), the characters "oldest son" represent Cain and Abel.

Notes

References

Bibliography

External links 

 

Bereshit (parashah)
Biblical murderers
Book of Genesis people
Book of Jubilees
 
Children of Adam and Eve
Christian mythology
Fictional farmers
Jewish folklore
Jewish mythology
Fratricides